Advanced Therapy Medicinal Products, or ATMPs, are advanced therapeutic drugs that are based on cell therapy or gene therapy (sometimes in combination with a medical device. The criteria to which a drug must conform to be classified as an ATMP, are defined in Article 17 of Regulation (EC) No 1394/2007 by the European Commission.

References 

Gene therapy
Drugs